Bondigui is a department or commune of Bougouriba Province in south-western Burkina Faso. Its capital lies at the town of Bondigui. According to the 2006 census the department has a total population of 18,782.

Towns and villages
BondiguiBonfessoDarodineDiarkadougouIntiédougouKobogoKpèdiaMouguéNabaléNabéréNahirindonObroSorindiguiWanZanawa-Pougouli

References

Departments of Burkina Faso
Bougouriba Province